Mieres is a municipality of Asturias, northern Spain, with approximately 38,000 inhabitants.  The municipality of Mieres is made up of the capital, Mieres del Camino and the villages of Baiña, Figaredo, Cenera, Loredo, La Peña, La Rebollada, Santullano, Santa Rosa, Seana, Ujo, Urbies, Valdecuna, Santa Cruz, Ablaña, Turón, Gallegos, Bustiello.

History
Mieres is the heart of the coal mining industry in Spain.  The topography of Mieres is mountainous with the greatest population centers being located in the valley along the banks of the  Caudal River (Río Caudal) valley in the center of Asturias. Before the Spanish Industrial Restructuring Mieres was one of the industrial backbones of Asturias, and hosted 70000 inhabitants in the 1960s. Today Mieres shelters a campus of the University of Oviedo and different museums in relation with the industrial heritage.

The municipality of Mieres is served by bus routes and the regional rail lines Renfe Feve and Renfe Cercanias, connected with Oviedo, Gijón, León and Langreo.

Festivals
Mieres’ most popular and important festival St. John's Bonfire (La Foguera de San Juan) occurs every June 24's eve, and is highlighted by a huge bonfire, cultural events, dancing, outdoor concerts, fireworks, al fresco dining and drinking. Another important festival is the Folixa na Primavera in April (Spring Fiesta), which includes dance and music performances from the nine European Celtic regions, food, drink and especially cider, (sidra).

Politics

Parishes

There are fifteen parishes:
Baíña
Figaredo
Gallegos
Loredo
Mieres del Camino
La Peña
La Rebollada
Santa Cruz
Santa Rosa
Santullano
Turón
Urbiés
Ujo
Seana
Valdecuna

Notable residents
Juan Carlos Ablanedo, footballer
José Andrés, chef
Vital Aza, author and playwright
María Luisa García, chef, author of the bestselling cookbook of Asturian cuisine in history
Innocencio of Mary Immaculate, saint
Jenny, singer and representative of Andorra in the Eurovision Song Contest 2006
Víctor Manuel, singer and songwriter
Nacho Martínez, actor
Federico Montoro, poet
Xaviel Vilareyo, author

Twin towns
 Karviná, Czech Republic
 San Miguel del Padrón, Cuba
 Amgala, Western Sahara

See also
 Church of Santa Eulalia de Ujo
 Premio de Novela Casino de Mieres

References

External links

Official website 
Mieres del Camino
Pipe Band of Mieres "Banda Gaites Villa Mieres"

Municipalities in Asturias